Argentina competed at the 2000 Summer Olympics in Sydney, Australia. 143 competitors, 98 men and 45 women, took part in 98 events in 21 sports.

Medalists

Athletics

Men

Women

Boxing

Key: 
 RSC – Referee stopped contest

Canoeing

Flatwater

Cycling

Mountain bike

Track
Pursuits

Points races

Diving

Equestrian

Fencing

Field hockey

Men
Team roster and tournament statistics
Coach: Jorge Ruiz

Legend:         

Preliminary Round (Pool B)

 Qualified for semifinals

5th to 8th place classification

7th place match

Women
Team roster and tournament statistics
Coach: Sergio Vigil

Preliminary round (Pool C)

 Qualified for semifinals

Medal pool

Results from matches against Australia and Spain were carried over from the preliminary round.

 Competed for the gold medal
 Competed for the bronze medal

Gold medal match

Gymnastics

Artistic

Judo

Men

 As there were more than 32 qualifiers for the tournament, three first round matches were held to reduce the field to 32 judoka.

Women

Rowing
Men

Women

Sailing

Eight men and three women competed in the Sailing competition for Argentina at the 2000 Olympic Games. They won one silver medal and two bronze medals.

Men

Women

Key
 OCS – On the course side of the starting line – A type of disqualification (scores one higher than the number of boats in the race)
 DNC – Did not come to starting area

Shooting

Swimming

Argentina competed in 18 swimming events, 11 men and 7 women, but only advanced out of the preliminary heats in one event.

Men

Women

Table Tennis

Taekwondo

Tennis

Men

Women

Triathlon

Volleyball

Beach

Indoor

Roster

Coach: Alberto Armoa

Group play

|}

Quarterfinal

Semifinal

Bronze medal match

Weightlifting

Women

See also
Argentina at the 1999 Pan American Games

Notes

Wallechinsky, David (2004). The Complete Book of the Summer Olympics (Athens 2004 Edition). Toronto, Canada. .
International Olympic Committee (2001). The Results. Retrieved 12 November 2005.
Sydney Organising Committee for the Olympic Games (2001). Official Report of the XXVII Olympiad Volume 1: Preparing for the Games. Retrieved 20 November 2005.
Sydney Organising Committee for the Olympic Games (2001). Official Report of the XXVII Olympiad Volume 2: Celebrating the Games. Retrieved 20 November 2005.
Sydney Organising Committee for the Olympic Games (2001). The Results. Retrieved 20 November 2005.
International Olympic Committee Web Site

References

Olympics
Nations at the 2000 Summer Olympics
2000 Summer Olympics